Pararrhaptica chlorippa is a moth of the family Tortricidae. It was first described by Edward Meyrick in 1928. It is endemic to the Hawaiian island of Oahu.

The larvae feed on Myrsine lessertiana.

External links

Archipini
Endemic moths of Hawaii